Karl Ipsberg (3 January 1870, in Suure-Kambja Parish (now Kambja Parish), Kreis Dorpat – 27 June 1943, in Vjatka Camp, Kirov Oblast, Russian SFSR) was an Estonian politician. He was a member of the Estonian National Assembly and of the I and II Riigikogu, representing the Farmers' Assemblies.

1921-1922 he was Minister of Roads.

References

1870 births
1943 deaths
People from Kambja Parish
People from Kreis Dorpat
Estonian Lutherans
Farmers' Assemblies politicians
Government ministers of Estonia
Members of the Estonian Constituent Assembly
Members of the Riigikogu, 1920–1923
Members of the Riigikogu, 1923–1926
Estonian people who died in Soviet detention